Ki no Maetsukimi (紀卿, literally "the Lord of Ki") was a Japanese noble and waka poet in the Nara period.

Biography 
The details of the life of the poet known as Ki no Maetsukimi (maetsukimi meaning a lord, and "Ki" being a noble family's name) are unknown. In Tenpyō 2 (730) he participated in a plum blossom-viewing party at the residence of Ōtomo no Tabito, then the governor (一大宰帥 ichi Dazai no sochi) of the Dazaifu.

Yūkichi Takeda's Man'yōshū Zenchūshaku (万葉集全註釈) speculates that he may have been the same person who died in Tenpyō 10 (738) while serving as co-administrator (大弐) of the Dazaifu.

Poetry 
Poem 815 in the Man'yōshū is attributed to him.

See also 
 Reiwa

References

Citations

Works cited 

 
 

8th-century Japanese poets
Man'yō poets
Japanese male poets
Ki clan